STSat-2A (Science and Technology Satellite-2A)  was a satellite launched by the Korea Aerospace Research Institute (KARI), the national space agency of South Korea, from the Naro Space Center in Goheung County, South Jeolla using the Naro-1 (KSLV-1) launch vehicle.

Spacecraft 
The Satellite Technology Research Center (SaTReC) developed STSat-2A as a Sun observation, satellite laser ranging and engineering and technology demonstration sponsored by the Ministry of Science and Technology. It was expected to be operational for about two years, and was scheduled to be launched between 2005 and 2007. The Laser Retroreflector Array (LRA) instrument was intended to measure the orbit of STSAT-2A, in order to investigate variations in its orbit.

It was a follow-up to STSat-1, which was launched using a Kosmos-3M rocket on 27 September 2003. Originally a Dual-channel Radiometers for Earth and Atmosphere Monitoring (DREAM) microwave radiometer was intended as the principal payload of STSat-2A for an expected launch in 2007. The Laser Retroreflector Array (LRA) was described as an early expected payload for STSat-2A which would consist of nine retroreflectors in a mechanical casing.

Mission 
STSat-2A has three missions: the indigenous research and development to place a satellite into low Earth orbit, development of indigenous spacecraft, and the ability to develop scientific payloads.

Launch 
STSat-2A was launched on the maiden flight of the Naro-1 launch vehicle, which lifted off the Naro Space Center, on the southern coast of South Korea at 08:00:33 UTC on 25 August 2009. The launch failed to place STSat-2A into orbit after half of the payload fairing failed to separate. This resulted in the second stage being too heavy to reach orbit, and it fell back to Earth along with the satellite. A second satellite, STSat-2B, was launched on 10 June 2010, but the launch vehicle failed again.

See also 

 Arirang-2 (KOMPSAT-2)

References

External links 

Earth observation satellites
Satellite launch failures
Satellites of South Korea
Spacecraft launched in 2009